Mount Adolphus Island, also called Muri or Mori in the native language, is an island of the Torres Strait Islands archipelago that is located at the very tip of Cape York Peninsula on the northern side of the Adolphus Channel, across from Albany Island and about  northeast of Bamaga in the far north region of Queensland, Australia.

Geography
It measures  in area. Blackwood Bay indents the west shore of the island.

History 
Djagaraga (also known as Yadhaigana, Dyagaraga and Yagulleone) is of the languages from the tip of Cape York. The language region includes the landscape within the local government boundaries of the Northern Peninsula Area Regional Council. Traditionally the language was spoken on Eastern Cape York particularly the localities of Albany Island and Mount Adolphus Island.

Shipwrecks
Aliquis, a ship captained by Gill and sailed from Port Jackson to Calcutta, was lost near Mount Adolphus Island, Torres Strait, in May 1839. There were no deaths. The crew were picked up by the ship Argyle, also bound Sydney to India.
RMS Quetta, a steel steamship of  that was built at Dumbarton, Scotland in 1881. Owned by the British, India Steam Navigation Company and captained by Alfred Sanders, the ship was bound from Brisbane to London. It foundered when she struck a needle of uncharted coral in Mount Adolphus Channel, on 28 February 1890. 133 lives were lost and there were 158 survivors. A submerged rock had ripped through six water-tight compartments of the hull, from the bows to the engine room. Stokers were killed instantly as water rushed onto the boilers causing them to explode. Lower-deck portholes burst under the water pressure and the sea flooded in swamping passengers asleep in their bunks. For half a minute the ship hung at a 45-degree angle, then she slid slowly beneath the surface. Within less than five minutes of striking the rock she was gone.

See also

List of Torres Strait Islands

References

Torres Strait Islands
Islands of Far North Queensland